The Lebanese Second Division is the second division of Lebanese football. It is controlled by the Lebanese Football Association. The top two teams qualify for the Lebanese Premier League and replace the relegated teams, while the bottom two are relegated to the Lebanese Third Division.

It was the second season to feature a "split" format, following its introduction in 2020–21, where the season was divided into two phases. The league was played between 21 August 2021 and 23 January 2022; Chabab Ghazieh and Salam Zgharta, who finished first and second respectively, were promoted to the Premier League, while Sporting Qlaileh and Shabab Majdal Anjar were relegated to the Third Division.

Teams

League table

Season statistics

Top scorers

Hat-tricks

Top assists

Clean sheets

References 

Lebanese Second Division seasons
Lebanon
2